South Carolina Highway 252 (SC 252) is a  state highway in the U.S. state of South Carolina. The highway connects the Anderson and Laurens areas with Honea Path and Ware Shoals. It has a unique feature in that it intersects U.S. Route 76 (US 76) three times along its length.

Route description
SC 252 begins at a partial interchange with US 76/US 178 (Belton Highway) southeast of Anderson, and south of Meadow Brook, within Anderson County. It travels to the east-southeast and crosses Neals Creek before an intersection with SC 413. The highway begins curving to the southeast and crosses over Hencoop Creek before entering Craytonville. There, it intersects SC 20 Connector (SC 20 Conn.; Clinkscales Road), which connects SC 252 with SC 20 (Trail Road), since they do not intersect. A short distance later, SC 252 travels under a bridge that carries SC 20. On the southeast side of Craytonville, it has another intersection with SC 252 Conn. The highway traveled to the east and crosses Barkers Creek. Then, the highway starts traveling to the east-northeast and crosses Blue Barker Creek, just before entering Honea Path.

Through town, it travels just south of Honea Path Middle School before it has a second intersection with US 76/US 178 (North Main Street). The three highway travel concurrently to the east. One block later, US 178 splits off to the right, onto Church Street. US 76/SC 252 continue to the east. They split northwest of Honea Path Elementary School. Just after leaving town, SC 252 enters Abbeville County and travels through Broadmouth. It intersects the eastern terminus of SC 184 just before entering Ware Shoals. Between Summit Drive and Edgewood Drive, the highway enters Greenwood County. At East Fleming Street, SC 252 turns left, while SC 252 Truck continues along North Greenwood Avenue. About one block later, it intersects US 25 Business (US 25 Bus.), onto which SC 252 turns left. The two highways travel concurrently to the north-northwest. Just before leaving town, they curve to the northeast. They cross over the Saluda River on the Senator William H. "Billy" O'Dell Bridge, which marks the Laurens County line. They curve to a due north direction and curve to the east-northeast and meet US 25 at an interchange. Here, US 25 Bus. ends, while SC 252 continues to the east-northeast. It curves to the northeast and crosses Walnut Creek. The highway travels through Poplar Springs. Then, it crosses over the Reedy River and Rabon Creek. A short distance later, it meets its eastern terminus, an intersection with US 76 (West Main Street).

Major intersections

Special routes

Ware Shoals business loop

South Carolina Highway 252 Business (SC 252 Bus.) is a business route of SC 252 that is actually the mainline route signed as a business route. It is entirely within Ware Shoals, within Greenwood County.

Ware Shoals truck route

South Carolina Highway 252 Truck (SC 252 Truck) is a  truck route of SC 252 that has its routing within Ware Shoals, within Greenwood County. About half of it is also in Laurens County.

SC 252 Truck begins at an intersection with the SC 252 mainline (North Greenwood Avenue/East Fleming Street). It travels to the southeast on North Greenwood Avenue. In downtown Ware Shoals it has a five-way intersection with U.S. Route 25 Bus. and Main Street. US 25 Bus. and SC 252 Truck travel concurrently on South Greenwood Avenue. They pass Ware Shoals High School and the Ware Shoals Golf Course. Just southeast of the city limits, they intersect US 25. Here, US 25 Bus. ends, and SC 252 Truck turns left onto US 25 north. US 25/SC 252 Truck enters Ware Shoals at Burnt Bridge Road. They cross over the Saluda River on the William T. Jones III Bridge. Here, they leave Ware Shoals and Greenwood County and enter Laurens County. They have an interchange with Power House Road. The concurrency curves to the north-northwest and reach an interchange with the northern terminus of US 25 Bus. and SC 252 Here, SC 252 Truck ends.

See also

References

External links

SC 252 South Carolina Highway Annex

252
Transportation in Anderson County, South Carolina
Transportation in Abbeville County, South Carolina
Transportation in Greenwood County, South Carolina
Transportation in Laurens County, South Carolina